CCETT may refer to:
Caribbean Centre of Excellence for Teacher Training in Belize
Centre commun d'études de télévision et télécommunications, a research institute in Rennes, France
Connecticut Center for Educational and Training Technologies in the U.S. state of Connecticut